Ramiriáñez Bravo de Saravia (1550–1594) was a Spanish nobleman, who served during the Viceroyalty of Peru as alguacil of the Inquisition, alcalde and regidor of Santiago, Chile.

Biography 

Born in Lima, was the son of the Conquistador and Gobernor of Chile Melchor Bravo de Saravia and Jerónima Sotomayor. His wife was Isabel García, the daughter of Captain Diego García de Cáceres, born in Plasencia.

Ramiriáñez Bravo de Saravia was a descendant of Hernán Bravo de Laguna, lord of Almenar and Pica.

In his military career Ramiriáñez Bravo de Saravia, participated in organized expeditions against the Mapuche Indians. He fought valiantly in the Arauco War. Bravo de Saravia was the commander of Spanish Armada, who led the battle against English pirates led by Thomas Cavendish and Francis Drake the event occurred on June 6, 1572, in the southern Pacific, with the victory of the Spanish army.

References

External links 
www.docelinajes.org

1550 births
1594 deaths
Spanish colonial governors and administrators
16th-century Spanish people
Spanish people in the Viceroyalty of Peru